Bazar-Korgon is a district of Jalal-Abad Region in western Kyrgyzstan. The seat lies at the town Bazar-Korgon.

Population

Rural communities and villages
In total, Bazar-Korgon District includes 57 settlements in 9 rural communities. Each rural community can consist of one or several villages. The rural communities and settlements in the Bazar-Korgon District are:

 City of Bazar-Korgon
 Akman (seat: Jangy-Akman; incl. Jarake, Kayyrma, Kolot, Korgon-Jar, Kosh-Korgon and Tash-Bulak)
 Arstanbap (seat: Arslanbob (Arstanbap); incl. Ak-Terek, Bel-Terek, Gava, Gumkana, Dashman, Jay-Terek and Jaradar)
 Beshik-Jon (seat: Beshik-Jon; incl. Jon, Baymunduz, Karacha and Kök-Alma)
 Kengesh (seat: Auk; incl. Kara-Jygach, Kyzyl-Oktyabr, Mogol-Korgon, Birinchi May, Seyitkazy, Shydyr and Kotkor)
 Kyzyl-Üngkür (seat: Kyzyl-Üngkür; incl. Ak-Bulak, Jaz-Kechüü, Katar-Janggak and Kösö-Terek)
 Mogol (seat: Oogon-Talaa; incl. Buvakol, Kaynar, Kara-Oy, Kyzyl-Suu, Köktongdu, Charbak and Chkalov)
 Saydykum (seat: Saydykum; incl. Arkalyk, Jangy-Abad, Jash-Lenin, Tösh, Dukur, Kyzyl-Ay, Toychubek-Chek, Turpak-Korgon, Khajir-Abad, Chek and Chong-Kurulush)
 Talduu-Bulak (seat: Kaba; incl. Sary-Jayyk, Katar-Janggak, Ak-Tyt, Üch-Bulak, Ak-Terek, Kök-Alma and Kyrgoo)

References 

Districts of Jalal-Abad Region